Charles Graves may refer to:

Charles Graves (bishop) (1812–1899), Bishop of Limerick and mathematician
Charles A. Graves (1850–1928), legal scholar and law professor
Charles Burleigh Graves (1841–1912), Justice of the Kansas Supreme Court 
Charles E. Graves (1849–1928), American politician in the Virginia House of Delegates
Charles H. Graves (1839–1928), American politician and ambassador
Charles H. Graves (Ohio politician) (1872–1940), Democratic politician in the U.S. state of Ohio
Charles Patrick Graves (1899–1971), English writer, grandson of the bishop